In system administration, orchestration is the automated configuring, coordinating, and managing of computer systems and software.

Many tools exist to automate server configuration and management, including Kubernetes, Ansible, Puppet, Salt, Terraform, and AWS CloudFormation.

Usage
Orchestration is often discussed in the context of service-oriented architecture, virtualization, provisioning, converged infrastructure and dynamic data center topics. Orchestration in this sense is about aligning the business request with the applications, data, and infrastructure.

In the context of cloud computing, the main difference between workflow automation and orchestration is that workflows are processed and completed as processes within a single domain for automation purposes, whereas orchestration includes a workflow and provides a directed action towards larger goals and objectives.

In this context, and with the overall aim to achieve specific goals and objectives (described through the quality of service parameters), for example, meet application performance goals using minimized cost and maximize application performance within budget constraints, cloud management solutions also encompass frameworks for workflow mapping and management.

See also

References 

Enterprise application integration
Business intelligence terms
Computing terminology
Orchestration software